Christopher Williams (born 1956) is an American conceptual artist and fine-art photographer. He lives in Cologne and works in Düsseldorf.

Early life and education
Williams was born in 1956 in Los Angeles, California. In the 1970s and early 1980s, he studied at the California Institute of the Arts where he received his B.F.A. and M.F.A. under the first generation of West Coast conceptual artists.

Work
Writing in Artforum in 2007, art critic Tim Griffin described Williams's approach as "sociophotographic." It has been said that Williams works within the tradition of institutional critique within what Sven Lütticken describes as an informal group, along with Willem de Rooij, Jeroen de Rijke and Mathias Poledna, that investigates the "parameters of the exhibition space." Chronologically, however, he belongs to The Pictures Generation. In 1982 Williams had his first solo exhibition at Jancar Kuhlenschmidt Gallery in Los Angeles.

Angola to Vietnam is a photography portfolio of glass flowers.

In 2000, at an exhibition at David Zwirner Gallery, in New York, Williams showed twenty photographs including a series of pictures of a 1964 Renault automobile on its side. Writing in The New York Times, Ken Johnson said, "the Renault was made in a French factory where significant revolutionary activities took place in 1968; hence it is tipped up like a barricade."

Williams' photographs oftentimes show increasingly obsolescent film-based equipment—cameras, lenses and darkroom gear—as beautiful and precise as catalog product shots. The accompanying text adds detail about how the equipment was used. Made by a professional photographer who follows Williams's directions, the conventionally scaled pictures have the glossy lucidity of excellent commercial photographs.

Educator
Since October 2008 he has been a professor in photography at the Kunstakademie Düsseldorf.

Personal life
Williams' wife is curator and former Stedelijk Museum director Ann Goldstein.

Publications
Christopher Williams: The production Line of Happiness. . Exhibition catalogue.
London: Whitechapel Gallery, 2014.
Walther König, 2014.
Christopher Williams: Printed in Germany. Walther König, 2014. . Exhibition catalogue.

Exhibitions

Solo exhibitions
2005: Secession, Vienna.
2005: Kunstverein Braunschweig, Germany.
2006: Museu Serralves, Porto, Portugal.
2007: Kunsthalle Zürich.
2010: Staatliche Kunsthalle Baden-Baden, Germany.
2010: Bergen Kunsthall, Norway.
2011: Museum Morsbroich, Leverkusen, Germany.
2011: Museum Dhondt-Dhaenens, Deurle, Belgium.
2013: Christopher Williams: For Example: Dix-Huit Leçons Sur La Société Industrielle (Revision 18), David Zwirner, London.
2014 at The Art Institute of Chicago and traveled to The Museum of Modern Art, New York.
2020: CHRISTOPHER WILLIAMS MODEL: Kochgeschirre, Kinder, Viet Nam (Angepasst zum Benutzen), C/O Berlin, Berlin

Exhibitions with others
2013: 55th Venice Biennale, curated by Massimiliano Gioni.

Awards
2005: Guggenheim Fellowship from the John Simon Guggenheim Memorial Foundation.
2005–2006: Foundation for Contemporary Arts Grants to Artists Award.
2014: Photography Catalogue of the Year, Paris Photo–Aperture Foundation PhotoBook Awards for Christopher Williams: The Production Line of Happiness and Christopher Williams: Printed in Germany.

References

Literature
 Burton, Johanna. “Christopher Williams at David Zwirner.” Artforum (May 2008): 376-377.
 Ekeberg, Jonas. “Fotografiets Utvidete Felft Photography’s Expanded Field.” OM FOTOGRAFI (2005): 3-11.
 Godfrey, Mark. “Christopher Williams.” Artforum (May 2007): 366.
 Lütticken, Sven. “Gegen die Wand.” Texte Zur Kunst (June 2009): 121-123.
 Rattemeyer, Christian. “Christopher Williams.” Parkett No. 77 (2006):155.

External links
 Christopher Williams at David Zwirner
 Gisela Capitain Gallery
 Wako Works of Art
 Christopher Williams at Artnet
 Christopher Williams in Dům umění České Budějovice, Budweis, Czech Republic

1956 births
Living people
Grinnell College alumni
Artists from California
American photographers
American conceptual artists
Academic staff of Kunstakademie Düsseldorf
Fine art photographers